The following is a list of published compositions by the composer Giuseppe Verdi (1813–1901).

List of operas and revisions 

 Revision of earlier opera, including translations with material musical changes.

Incomplete projects
Re Lear (King Lear), 1856. Librettist Antonio Somma worked with Verdi on completing a libretto for an opera based on Shakespeare's King Lear. This libretto was based on an incomplete one written by librettist Salvatore Cammarano before he died in 1852. It was never set to music.

Songs 

 Sei Romanze (1838)
Non t'accostar all'urna (Jacopo Vittorelli)
More, Elisa, lo stanco poeta (Tommaso Bianchi)
In solitaria stanza (Jacopo Vittorelli)
Nell'orror di notte oscura (Carlo Angiolini)
Perduta ho la pace (trans. by Luigi Balestra from Goethe's Faust)
Deh, pietoso, o addolorata (trans. by Luigi Balestra from Goethe's Faust)
 L'esule (1839) (Temistocle Solera)
 La seduzione (1839) (Luigi Balestra)
 Guarda che bianca luna: notturno (1839) (Jacopo Vittorelli) for soprano, tenor, bass and flute obbligato
 Album di Sei Romanze (1845)
Il tramonto (Andrea Maffei)
La zingara (S. Manfredo Maggioni)
Ad una stella (Maffei)
Lo Spazzacamino (Felice Romani)
Il Mistero (Felice Romani)
Brindisi (Maffei)
 Il poveretto (1847) (Maggioni)
 L'Abandonée (1849) (Escudier)
 Stornello (1869) (anon.)
 Pietà Signor (1894) (Verdi and Boito)

Sacred works 

 Messa da Requiem (22 May 1874, San Marco, Milan): mass in memory of Alessandro Manzoni, for four solo voices, chorus, and orchestra
 Libera me for Messa per Rossini (1869; premiered posthumously 11 September 1988, Stuttgart). Mass in memory of Gioachino Rossini. Verdi wrote the "Libera me", with contributions from twelve other composers.
 Pater Noster (1873): for 5-part chorus
 Ave Maria (1880): for soprano and strings
 Quattro pezzi sacri (7 April 1898, Grande Opéra, Paris):
Ave Maria (1889): for mixed solo voices
Stabat Mater (1897): for mixed chorus and orchestra
Laudi alla Vergine Maria (1888): for female voices
Te Deum (1896): for double chorus and orchestra

Other sacred works 

 Tantum ergo in G major (1836)
 Tantum ergo in F major
 Messa in E-flat major
 Laudate pueri in D major
 Qui tollis in F major

Other vocal works (secular) 
 Suona la tromba (1848) (Goffredo Mameli), a patriotic hymn
 Inno delle nazioni (1862, London) (Arrigo Boito), cantata for tenor, chorus and orchestra. (See Hymn (or Anthem) of the Nations)

Instrumental, orchestral, chamber works

Piano
 Romanza senza parole (written 1844, published 1865)
 Waltz in F Major (written 1859)
 Valzer (written by Verdi for piano, but not published until 1963 when Nino Rota adapted it for orchestra in his score for Luchino Visconti's film The Leopard)
Orchestral

 Sinfonia in B-flat major
 Sinfonia in C major
 Sinfonia del M. Verdi in D major 
 with Giacomo Mori, Canto di Virginia Con Variazioni per Oboe Composte con accomp.to d'Orchestra quintetto

Chamber
 String Quartet in E minor (1873)
 Stramberia for violin and piano

References
Notes

Sources
Budden, Julian (1984), The Operas of Verdi, Vol. 2. London: Cassell, Ltd., 1984, pp. 360–423 
Budden, Julian (1984), The Operas of Verdi, Vol. 3: From Don Carlos to Falstaff. London: Cassell. .
Pitou, Spire (1990). The Paris Opéra: An Encyclopedia of Operas, Ballets, Composers, and Performers. Growth and Grandeur, 1815–1914. New York: Greenwood Press. .
Walker, Frank, The Man Verdi, New York: Knopf, 1962; Chicago: University of Chicago Press, 1982  
Rizzo, Dino, Verdi filarmonico e Maestro dei filarmonici bussetani, Parma, Istituto nazionale di Studi verdiani, 2005, Premio Rotary Club "Giuseppe Verdi" - 6. 

 
Verdi